Alan Hamel (born June 30, 1936) is a Canadian entertainer, producer and television host.

Early life 
Hamel was born in Toronto of Jewish descent. He was in the television arts program at Ryerson Institute of Technology in 1954 but did not graduate.

Career
Hamel co-hosted the Canadian children's television series Razzle Dazzle (1961–64). The show featured a talking turtle, Howard. In the late 1960s he hosted two syndicated game shows which aired on all the ABC owned and operated TV stations as well as others: Wedding Party (1968) and Anniversary Game (1969), where he first met Suzanne Somers, whom he later married in 1979.  In the late 1970s, he hosted The Alan Hamel Show, a popular daytime talk show on CTV. People magazine considered him "Canada's leading TV talk show host". After Hamel stepped down as host in 1980, fellow Canadian Alan Thicke took over and the show was retitled The Alan Thicke Show and, later, Don Harron continued the franchise as host of his own eponymous talk show that aired in the same time slot.

For several years during the late 1970s and early 1980s, Hamel was a commercial pitchman for American Stores, a coast-to-coast chain of supermarkets.  Specifically, he did advertisements for Alpha Beta stores in the western United States, and also appeared in occasional spots for Acme Markets in the northeastern United States.

Hamel eventually became a producer, often working on projects involving his wife. He occasionally performed as an actor as well, also sometimes on Somers' shows.

Personal life
Hamel has two children, a son Stephen and a daughter Leslie, from his first marriage to Marilyn Hamel. He met his current wife, actress and author Suzanne Somers who is ten years his junior, while she worked as a prize model on The Anniversary Game, a game show he hosted. Hamel and Somers lived together for about ten years before marrying. A rabbi and a Catholic priest officiated at their wedding. Hamel is stepfather to Bruce Somers, Jr., Suzanne Somers' son from a previous marriage during her teens.

Filmography
 1960: Midnight Zone (CBC)
 1961: Junior Roundup - Host
 1961–64: Razzle Dazzle (CBC Television)
 1962: A Summer Night - Host
 1963: Nightcap (TV series) 
 1965: Vacation Time - Co-host
 1968: Wedding Party (ABC/syndicated)
 1969: Anniversary Game (ABC/syndicated)
 1971–72: Mantrap - Host
 1972–73: Alan Hamel's Comedy Bag (CBC)
 1976–80: The Alan Hamel Show (CTV)
 1977: Tattletales (CBS)
 1977: Lou Grant in Scoop as Councilman Garbers
 1977:  The Last Hurrah (TV movie) as George Sherrard
 1978: All in the Family in The Commercial as Ricky Buffano
 1979: Look Magazine Gala Party (TV movie)
 1988: She's the Sheriff in All Alone (1988) as Horton

References

External links

1936 births
Canadian children's television personalities
Canadian game show hosts
Living people
People from Toronto
Toronto Metropolitan University alumni